William Reginald Beckwith (2 November 190826 June 1965) was an English film and television actor, who made over one hundred film and television appearances in his 
career.  He died of a heart attack aged 56.

Beckwith was also a film critic and playwright before the war, and from 1941–45, was a BBC war correspondent. His play Boys in Brown was filmed in 1949, and he co-wrote the film You're Only Young Twice in 1952, based on James Bridie's play.

Selected filmography

 Freedom Radio (1941) as Emil Fenner
 My Brother's Keeper (1948) as 1st Barber (uncredited)
 Scott of the Antarctic (1948) as Bowers / Lt. H.R. Bowers R.I.M.
 Miss Pilgrim's Progress (1949) as Mr. Jenkins
 The Body Said No! (1950) as Benton
 Mister Drake's Duck (1951) as Mr. Boothby 
 Circle of Danger (1951) as Oliver
 Another Man's Poison (1951) as Mr. Bigley
 Whispering Smith Hits London (1952) as Manson
 Brandy for the Parson (1952) as Scout Master
 You're Only Young Twice (1952) as BBC Commentator
 Penny Princess (1952) as Minister of Finance - Blacksmith
 The Titfield Thunderbolt (1953) as Coggett
 Genevieve (1953) as J. C. Callahan
 Innocents in Paris (1953) as Photographer (uncredited)
 The Million Pound Note (1953) as Rock
 Don't Blame the Stork (1954)
 Fast and Loose (1954) as Reverend Tripp-Johnson 
 The Runaway Bus (1954) as Telephone Man
 Dance, Little Lady (1954) as Poldi
 Lease of Life (1954) as Foley
 The Men of Sherwood Forest (1954) as Friar Tuck
 Aunt Clara (1954) as Alfie Pearce
 The Lyons in Paris (1955) as Capt. Le Grand
 Break in the Circle (1955) as Dusty
 They Can't Hang Me (1955) as Harold
 A Yank in Ermine (1955) as Kimp
 Jumping for Joy (1956) as Smithers
 The March Hare (1956) as J. Blacker Insurance Brocker
 Charley Moon (1956) as Vicar
 It's a Wonderful World (1956) as Professional Manager
 A Touch of the Sun (1956) as Herbert Hardcastle
 Carry On Admiral (1957) as Receptionist 
 These Dangerous Years (1957) as Hairdresser
 Lucky Jim (1957) as University Porter
 Night of the Demon (1957) as Mr. Meek 
 Up the Creek (1958) as Publican
 Law and Disorder (1958) as Vickery
 Next to No Time (1958) as Warren
 The Horse's Mouth (1958) as Capt. Jones
 Rockets Galore! (1958) as Mumford
 The Navy Lark (1959) as CNI
 The Captain's Table (1959) as Burtweed
 The 39 Steps (1959) as Lumsden
 The Ugly Duckling (1959) as Reginald
 Friends and Neighbours (1959) as Wilf Holmes
 Upstairs and Downstairs (1959) as Parson
 Expresso Bongo (1959) as Reverend Tobias Craven
 Desert Mice (1959) as Fred
 Bottoms Up (1960) as Bishop Wendover
 Doctor in Love (1960) as Wildewinde
 Dentist in the Chair (1960) as Mr. Watling
 There Was a Crooked Man (1960) as Station Master
 The Girl on the Boat (1961) as Barman
 Five Golden Hours (1961) as Brother Geronimo
 The Night We Got the Bird (1961) as Chippendale Charlie 
 Double Bunk (1961) as  Harper
 Dentist on the Job (1961) as Mr. Duff
 The Day the Earth Caught Fire (1961) as Harry
 Hair of the Dog (1962) as Fred Tickle
 Night of the Eagle (1962) as Harold Gunnison
 The Password Is Courage (1962) as Unterofficer
 The King's Breakfast (1963) as Magician
 Just for Fun (1963) as Opposition Leader
 The V.I.P.s (1963) as Head Waiter (uncredited)
 Lancelot and Guinevere (1963) as Sir Dagonet
 Doctor in Distress (1963) as Meyer
 Never Put It in Writing (1964) as Lombardi
 A Shot in the Dark (1964) as Receptionist at nudist camp
 The Yellow Rolls-Royce (1964) as Reporter (uncredited)
 Gonks Go Beat (1965) as Professor
 The Amorous Adventures of Moll Flanders (1965) as Doctor
 Mister Moses (1965) as Parkhust
 The Secret of My Success (1965) as Gen. Ferdinand Velez
 The Big Job (1965) as Register Office Official
 Thunderball (1965) as Kenniston
 How to Undress in Public Without Undue Embarrassment (1965)
 Where the Spies Are (1966) as Mr. Kahn (final film role)

References

External links
 

1908 births
1965 deaths
Male actors from York
English male film actors
English male television actors
20th-century English male actors